Aleksandar Cincar-Marković (20 June 1889 – 1947) was a Serbian politician who was the Minister of Foreign Affairs of the Kingdom of Yugoslavia.

See also
 Yugoslav accession to the Tripartite Pact

References

1889 births
1947 deaths
Politicians from Belgrade
Foreign ministers of Yugoslavia
Yugoslav Radical Union politicians
People executed by Yugoslavia